Lua may refer to the following languages:

African
 Luba-Kasai language (ISO 639 code: lua), a Bantu language of Central Africa
 Niellim language, also known as Lua, a Niger–Congo language of southern Chad

Austroasiatic
 Lawa language, or La'wa/L'wa, a Mon–Khmer language of Thailand
 a collective term for Mon-Khmer languages of the Lua people, namely:
 Mal language
 Phai language

Computing
 Lua (programming language)

See also
 Lua (disambiguation)
 Luo language (disambiguation)